Marcus Berrett (born 23 September 1975 in Halifax) is an English former professional squash player who represented Italy internationally. He reached a career-high world ranking of 37 in January 1999.

References

1975 births
Living people
English male squash players